"Bad Liar" is a song by American pop rock band Imagine Dragons. The song was released through Interscope and Kidinakorner records on November 6, 2018, as the fourth single from their fourth studio album, Origins (2018). It was written by Imagine Dragons, Aja Volkman and Jorgen Odegard, and produced by Odegard.

"Bad Liar" peaked at number 56 on the US Billboard Hot 100. It topped the charts in Czech Republic and Latvia, and reached the top 10 in Belgium, Finland, Slovakia and Switzerland; as well as the top 20 in Australia, Austria, Germany, Italy, New Zealand, Norway, Poland, Singapore and Sweden. On May 31, 2019, a "stripped" version titled "Bad Liar- Stripped" was released. The song was used in the 2020 Cartoon Saloon film Wolfwalkers.

Background
"Bad Liar" was co-written by Imagine Dragons lead vocalist Dan Reynolds and his wife Aja Volkman shortly before they separated. However, Reynolds has said the couple did not end up going through with the divorce.

The Norwegian progressive rock band Maraton pointed out that the cover image for their single "Blood Music" is the same as Imagine Dragons’ cover image for "Bad Liar", with only the coloration being different. Maraton's single was released in February 2018, while Imagine Dragons’ song dropped nine months later in November 2018. Despite the undeniable shared artwork, Maraton released a statement revealing they had purchased the artwork from the artist Beeple Crap, but had no deal giving them exclusive rights to the photo.

Critical reception
Idolator called the song a "brutally honest breakup anthem", and described it as "raw and stripped back". Billboard compared the song's lyrical heaviness to the band's track "Demons".

Music video
A music video for the song was released on January 24, 2019. The video centers around a high school couple, while it cuts to the band performing the song in the parking lot of that school various times throughout the video. The video continues to add an ominous tone with the surrounding dark shadows and use of fictional levitation. It was directed by Ryan Reichenfeld and was filmed at Green Valley High School, in Henderson, Nevada. The video features dancer Autumn Miller with choreography by Marissa Osato.
As of February 2023, the music video has received 421 million views and 4.3 million likes.

Live performances
The song was first performed live at the Cosmopolitan in Las Vegas, Nevada. It was also performed at the 2019 College Football Playoff National Championship halftime show.

Personnel
Dan Reynolds – lead vocals, keyboards
Wayne Sermon – guitar, backing vocals 
Daniel Platzman – drums, viola, backing vocals
Ben McKee – bass guitar, synthesizer, backing vocals 
Jorgen Odegard – production

Charts

Weekly charts

Year-end charts

Certifications

Release history

References

2018 singles
2018 songs
Imagine Dragons songs
Songs written by Wayne Sermon
Songs written by Dan Reynolds (musician)
Songs written by Ben McKee
Songs written by Daniel Platzman
Songs containing the I–V-vi-IV progression
Kidinakorner singles
Interscope Records singles